Good News is the second studio album by British musician Ian Yates. 7Core Music released the album on 24 June 2012.

Critical reception

Rating the album a ten out of ten for Cross Rhythms, Tony Cummings writes, "We must now report that, if anything, 'Good News' is even better." Sarah Fine, giving the album three and a half stars from New Release Today, states, "this is a fantastic album." Awarding the album five stars at Louder Than the Music, Dave Wood describes, "Ian's sublime and unique style cleverly mixes sounds to produce a diverse album full of creativeness."

Track listing

References

2012 albums
Ian Yates albums